Prince Moulay Abdellah Stadium is a multi-purpose stadium in Rabat, Morocco. It is named after Prince Moulay Abdellah of Morocco.

History
It was built in 1983 and is the home ground of AS FAR. It is currently used mostly for football matches and it can also stage athletics. The stadium has an occupancy of 53,000 people. 
Since 2008 it has hosted the Meeting International Mohammed VI d'Athlétisme de Rabat. It was a confirmed venue for the 2015 Africa Cup of Nations until Morocco was stripped of its hosting rights. Morocco asked for the Africa Cup of Nations to be postponed because of fear of the Ebola pandemic that was affecting several African countries at the time. The country was then ruled out as a host of the international competition.

The Prince Moulay Abdellah Stadium was also a venue for the 2014 FIFA Club World Cup. The venue was planned to be one of the host stadiums for the unsuccessful bid to host the 2026 FIFA World Cup. It was intended to host Quarter-final matches if Morocco had been awarded the World Cup.

It is now planned as a potential venue to host the 2030 FIFA World Cup as Morocco is gearing up its co-bidding with Portugal and Spain. If this happens it will be the first cross-confederation bid by more than one continent. It will also be used as the opening and closing ceremony venue for the 2019 African Games after Malabo, Equatorial Guinea withdrew its rights to host the African Games.

International events
The stadium hosted the following international events:
1988 African Cup of Nations
2014 FIFA Club World Cup
2019 African Games
2020 CAF Confederation Cup Final
2020 Arab Club Champions Cup Final
2022 Women's Africa Cup of Nations Final
 2022 CAF Super Cup
 2022 CAF Women's Champions League Final
 2022 FIFA Club World Cup

See also
List of African stadiums by capacity
List of football stadiums in Morocco
List of association football stadiums by capacity

References

External links

Photos at fussballtempel.net
Photos of Stadiums in Morocco at cafe.daum.net/stade

Football venues in Morocco
Athletics (track and field) venues in Morocco
S
Multi-purpose stadiums in Morocco
Sports venues completed in 1983
1983 establishments in Morocco
Sport in Rabat
AS FAR (football)
Stadiums of the African Games
Diamond League venues
20th-century architecture in Morocco